Butte des Morts is an unincorporated census-designated place in the town of Winneconne, in Winnebago County, Wisconsin, United States.

As of the 2010 census, its population was 962. The community is located at the north side of (Big) Lake Butte des Morts  on the former route of Wisconsin Highway 110. The name means "hill of the dead" in French. Butte des Morts uses the ZIP code 54927. The Augustin Grignon Hotel, listed on the National Register of Historic Places, is located within the community.

Origin of Name

In 1730 French soldiers and Menominee warriors massacred people of the Sauk Nation. The French named the place the Hill of the Dead, or Butte des Morts.

Images

References

Census-designated places in Wisconsin
Census-designated places in Winnebago County, Wisconsin